The Germany national junior handball team is the national under–20 handball team of Germany. Controlled by the German Handball Association, it represents Germany in international matches.

References

External links
World Men's Junior Championship table
European Men's Junior Championship table

Handball in Germany
Men's national junior handball teams
Handball